Amuvi is a village in Nigeria's Arochukwu Local Government Area of Abia State.

References

Populated places in Abia State